John R. Rodenberg (born June 8, 1956) is an American attorney and jurist who served as a judge of the Minnesota Court of Appeals from 2012 to 2020.

Early life and education
Rodenberg was born in New Ulm, Minnesota. He earned a Bachelor of Arts degree from St. Olaf College and a Juris Doctor from Hamline University. During law school, Rodenberg wrote for the Hamline Law Review.

Career
He worked in private practice until 2000, when he was appointed to serve as a district court judge by then-Governor Jesse Ventura. He was elected vice chair of the Minnesota Judicial Council in 2007.

Rodenberg was appointed to the Minnesota Court of Appeals in 2012 by Governor Mark Dayton. He retired on August 21, 2020.

References

Living people
Minnesota Court of Appeals judges
St. Olaf College alumni
Hamline University alumni
People from New Ulm, Minnesota
1956 births